This is a list of marine biologists.

 Donald Putnam Abbott (1920–1986), American marine invertebrate zoologist
 Isabella Aiona Abbott (1919–2010), American marine botanist
 Ali Abdelghany (born 1944), Egyptian marine biologist
 Jakob Johan Adolf Appellöf (1857–1921), Swedish marine zoologist
 Leanne Armand (born 1968), Australian marine scientist
 Samuel Stillman Berry (1887–1984), American marine zoologist
 Henry Bryant Bigelow (1879–1967), American marine biologist
 Jean Bouillon (1926–2009), Belgian marine zoologist
 Rachel Carson (1907–1964), American marine biologist and author
 Carl Chun (1852–1914), German marine biologist
 Eugenie Clark (1922–2015), American marine biologist
 Malcolm Clarke (1930–2013), British cephalopod expert
 Jacques-Yves Cousteau (1910–1997), French marine explorer, conservationist, and filmmaker
 Charles Darwin (1809–1882), wrote Structure and Distribution of Coral Reefs (1842) while aboard 
 Paul K. Dayton (born 1941), American benthic marine ecologist noted for work in kelp forest ecology
 Finn Devold (1902–1977), Norwegian marine biologist
 Anton Dohrn (1840–1909), German marine biologist
 Nicole Dubilier, American marine microbiologist, head of Max Planck Institute for Marine Microbiology
 Patricia Louise Dudley (1929–2004) American zoologist specializing in copepods
 Sylvia Earle (born 1935), American oceanographer
 Austin Gallagher, marine biologist
 Ruth Gates (1962–2018), American marine biologist noted for work on coral reefs
 J. Frederick Grassle (1939–2018), American marine biologist
 Judith Grassle, marine ecologist
 Gordon Gunter (1909–1998), American marine biologist and fisheries scientist notable for pioneering fisheries research in the northern Gulf of Mexico
 Ernst Haeckel (1834–1919), German physician, zoologist, marine biologist and evolutionist
 Benjamin Halpern, American marine conservationist
 Hans Hass (born 1919), Austrian marine biologist and diving pioneer
 Gotthilf Hempel (born 1929), German marine biologist
 Stephen Hillenburg (1961–2018), American animator (creator of SpongeBob SquarePants); previously worked as a marine biology teacher for several years
 Hirohito, the Shōwa Emperor (1901–1989), jellyfish taxonomist
 Johan Hjort (1869–1948), Norwegian marine zoologist and one of the founders of ICES
 Bruno Hofer (1861–1916), German fisheries scientist
 Martin W. Johnson (1893–1984), American marine biologist and biological oceanographer
 Benjamin Kahn (born 1955), Israeli marine biologist and environmental activist
 Uwe Kils (born 1951), German marine biologist
 Otto Kinne (1923-2015), German marine biologist
 Nancy Knowlton, coral reef biologist and author of Citizens of the Sea (2010)
 August David Krohn (1803–1891), Russian/German zoologist
 Paul L. Kramp (1887–1975), Danish zoologist working on jellyfish
 William Elford Leach (1790–1836), English zoologist and marine biologist
 Nicholai Miklukho-Maklai (1846–1888), Russian marine biologist and anthropologist
Melissa Cristina Márquez, "Mother of Sharks," marine biologist and science communicator
 Flower Msuya (born 1959), Tanzanian phycologist
 Sir John Murray (1841–1914), Scots-Canadian marine biologist
 Anders Sandøe Ørsted (1816–1872), Danish marine botanist studied arctic nematodes and marine algae
 Robert T. Paine (1933–2016), American marine zoologist known for developing the "keystone species" concept
 Joseph R. Pawlik (born 1960), American marine biologist
 Ronald C. Phillips (1932–2005), American marine botanist, co-author of Seagrasses (1980); worldwide development of seagrass science told in autobiographical Travels with Seagrass (2013)
 Syed Zahoor Qasim (born 1926), Indian marine biologist
 Ed Ricketts (1897–1948), American marine biologist noted for a pioneering study of intertidal ecology
 Harald Rosenthal (born 1937), German hydrobiologist known for his work in fish farming and ecology
 Anne Rudloe (1947–2012), American co-founder of Gulf Specimen Marine Laboratory
 Jack Rudloe (born 1943), American co-founder of Gulf Specimen Marine Laboratory and writer of several popular works on the sea including The Sea Brings Forth, and The Erotic Ocean.
 Frederick Stratten Russell (1897–1984), British marine biologist known for his work on zooplankton.
 Georg Sars (1837–1927), Norwegian marine biologist
 Michael Sars (1809–1869), Norwegian theologian and biologist
 Oscar Elton Sette (1900–1972), American fisheries scientist notable for pioneering modern fisheries science and fisheries oceanography
 Bell M. Shimada (1922–1958), American fisheries scientist notable for pioneering studies of tuna stocks in the equatorial Pacific Ocean
 Ronald Shimek (born 1948), American marine biologist noted mainly for his work on scaphopods and turrid gastropods
 Charles Wyville Thomson (1832–1882), Scottish marine biologist
 Gunnar Thorson (1906–1971), Danish marine biologist
 Anne Thynne (1800–1866), British marine zoologist
 Takasi Tokioka (1913–2001), Japanese marine biologist known for his work on soft bodied zooplankton and tunicates
 Ruth Turner (1915–2000), marine biologist
 Anna Weber-van Bosse (1852–1942), marine phycologist
 María Elena Caso (1915-1991), Mexican marine biologist

See also

 List of fictional scientists and engineers
 Notable fisheries scientists
 Notable ichthyologists

References

Marine